Cider Making is a mid 19th-century painting by American artist William Sidney Mount. Done in oil on canvas, the painting depicts the making of cider at a cider mill in Long Island. Mount's work is in the collection of the Metropolitan Museum of Art.

Description 
Cider Making was painted by William Sidney Mount in either 1840 or 1841. The painting can be seen as a political work; Mount, a conservative democrat, was strongly opposed to the presidency of Andrew Jackson and his successor Martin Van Buren, whose political opponent William Henry Harrison often used rural imagery to criticize the former. Harrison's Whig Party was also commonly associated with cider makers.

The cider mill depicted in the painting was located in Setauket, Long Island, and was in operation until the early 20th century. Mount was paid $250 for the painting.

References 

1840 paintings
Paintings in the collection of the Metropolitan Museum of Art